The Foster House is a historic house at 420 North Spruce Street in Hope, Arkansas.  The house was designed by Texarkana architects Witt, Siebert and Halsey, and built in 1918 for Leonidas Foster, a prominent local businessman, landowner, and cotton broker.  It is a -story brick structure, with a hip roof pierced by a gable-roofed dormer.  A porch supported by brick piers extends across the front facade, and is augmented by a porte-cochère on the left side.  The house is an excellent local example of a Foursquare house with Craftsman and Prairie details.

The house was listed on the National Register of Historic Places in 1991.

See also
National Register of Historic Places listings in Hempstead County, Arkansas

References

Houses on the National Register of Historic Places in Arkansas
Prairie School architecture in Arkansas
Houses completed in 1917
Houses in Hempstead County, Arkansas
National Register of Historic Places in Hempstead County, Arkansas